Mudumala Henry Samuel (1912-1972) was an Indian politician. He was a member of the Rajya Sabha, the upper house of the Parliament of India representing Andhra Pradesh  as a member of the Indian National Congress for three terms.

References

1912 births
1972 deaths
Rajya Sabha members from Andhra Pradesh
Indian National Congress politicians from Andhra Pradesh